Jesse Pearson is an American editor and writer. He was the editor-in-chief of Vice Magazine from October 2002 until December 2010, and has interviewed notable figures such as David Lynch, Marina Abramović, Bret Easton Ellis, David Simon and Johnny Knoxville.

References

External links 
 Jesse-Pearson.com (Official)
 So What Do You Do, Vice Editor-in-Chief Jesse Pearson?
 Interview: VICE’s Jesse Pearson on Where the Wild Things Are, Spike Jonze, and the Future of VICE Films & VBS.TV

American editors
Living people
Date of birth missing (living people)
Year of birth missing (living people)